is a Japanese professional baseball catcher for the Yomiuri Giants in Japan's Nippon Professional Baseball.

On November 16, 2018, he was selected for the Yomiuri Giants roster at the 2018 MLB Japan All-Star Series exhibition game against MLB All-Stars.

On June 3, 2020, it was announced that Ohshiro and Giants teammate Hayato Sakamoto both tested positive for COVID-19.

References

External links

NPB.com

1993 births
Living people
Japanese baseball players
Nippon Professional Baseball catchers
Baseball people from Okinawa Prefecture
Tokai University alumni
Yomiuri Giants players